Lactic acid/citric acid/potassium bitartrate, sold under the brand name Phexxi, is a non-hormonal combination medication used as a method of birth control. It contains lactic acid, citric acid, and potassium bitartrate. It is a gel inserted into the vagina.

The most common adverse reactions include vulvovaginal burning sensation, vulvovaginal pruritus, vulvovaginal mycotic infection, urinary tract infection, vulvovaginal discomfort, bacterial vaginosis, vaginal discharge, genital discomfort, dysuria, and vulvovaginal pain.

Medical uses 
The combination is indicated for the prevention of pregnancy in females of reproductive potential for use as an on-demand method of contraception.

History 
The combination was approved for medical use in the United States in May 2020.

References

External links
 
 
 

Barrier contraception
Combination drugs
Methods of birth control
Spermicide
Vagina